Pascal Monkam (1930 – 27 February 2021) was a Cameroonian businessman. He notably owned the hotel chain La Falaise and was the father of 16 children.

Biography
He lost his father at a very young age and lived with his brother, Michel, in Douala.

Monkam founded the Société des Établissements Monkam in the early 1960s. His father-in-law gave him a loan of 300,000 Central African francs so that he could buy his first hotel, "Coin du Plaisir". He opened other locations in South Africa, including twin towers bearing his name and three hotels in Pretoria.

Aside from his business life, Monkam was polygamous, with five wives: Jeanne, Jacqueline, Jeannette, Dorothée and Chantal. He fathered sixteen children, including Paris and London Bar member Alain-Christian Monkam.

In 2019, President of Cameroon Paul Biya awarded Monkam a Grand Cordon of the Order of Valour.

In 2021, Monkam was taken to South Africa as part of a medical evacuation and placed on a ventilator. On 18 February, rumors of his death were circulated across Cameroon by numerous media outlets. However, hours later, these rumors were debunked by his son, Alain-Christian and by Cameroon Radio Television.

Pascal Monkam died on 27 February 2021 in South Africa at the age of 90.

References

Cameroonian businesspeople
1930 births
2021 deaths
Grand Cordons of the Order of Valour
Deaths from the COVID-19 pandemic in Cameroon